Robert Charles Wickliffe (May 1, 1874 – June 11, 1912), (grandson of Charles A. Wickliffe and cousin of John Crepps Wickliffe Beckham) was a U.S. Representative from Louisiana; born in Bardstown, Kentucky, while his parents were visiting relatives; he attended the public schools of St. Francisville, Louisiana; was graduated from Centre College, Danville, Kentucky, in 1895 and from the law department of Tulane University, New Orleans, Louisiana in 1897; was admitted to the bar in 1898 and commenced practice in St. Francisville; member of the state constitutional convention in 1898; enlisted as a private in Company E, First Regiment, Louisiana Volunteer Infantry, during the Spanish–American War; was mustered out of the service in October 1898; returned to West Feliciana Parish; district attorney of the twenty-fourth judicial district of Louisiana 1902–1906; elected as a Democrat to the 61st and 62nd congresses, (March 4, 1909 – June 11, 1912), when he was killed while crossing a railroad bridge in Washington, D.C.; interment in Cave Hill Cemetery, Louisville, Kentucky.

See also
List of United States Congress members who died in office (1900–49)

External links
 Cemetery Memorial by La-Cemeteries
 "Killed by a Train", The Emporia Gazette, Kansas, 11 June 1912
 Robert C. Wickliffe, late a representative from Louisiana, Memorial addresses delivered in the House of Representatives and Senate frontispiece 1913

1874 births
1912 deaths
Centre College alumni
Tulane University Law School alumni
Burials at Cave Hill Cemetery
Accidental deaths in Washington, D.C.
Railway accident deaths in the United States
People from Bardstown, Kentucky
American military personnel of the Spanish–American War
Democratic Party members of the United States House of Representatives from Louisiana
19th-century American politicians
People from St. Francisville, Louisiana